In Greek mythology, Caletor (Ancient Greek: Καλήτωρ) may refer to one of the following characters associated with the Trojan War:

Caletor, one of the defenders of Troy. He was the son of Clytius and brother of Procleia. Caletor was killed by Ajax while trying to set fire to the ship of Protesilaus.
Caletor, father of the Achaean soldier, Aphareus.

Notes

References 

 Homer, The Iliad with an English Translation by A.T. Murray, Ph.D. in two volumes. Cambridge, MA., Harvard University Press; London, William Heinemann, Ltd. 1924. Online version at the Perseus Digital Library.
 Homer, Homeri Opera in five volumes. Oxford, Oxford University Press. 1920. Greek text available at the Perseus Digital Library.
 Pausanias, Description of Greece with an English Translation by W.H.S. Jones, Litt.D., and H.A. Ormerod, M.A., in 4 Volumes. Cambridge, MA, Harvard University Press; London, William Heinemann Ltd. 1918. Online version at the Perseus Digital Library
 Pausanias, Graeciae Descriptio. 3 vols. Leipzig, Teubner. 1903.  Greek text available at the Perseus Digital Library.

Trojans